This is a summary of the year 2014 in British music charts.

The UK Singles Chart and UK Albums Chart are two of many music charts compiled by the Official Charts Company (OCC) that calculates the best-selling singles/albums of the week in the United Kingdom. Since 2004 the chart has been based on the sales of both physical singles/albums and digital downloads, with airplay figures excluded from the official chart. From 6 July (chart dated week ending 12 July covering the sales in the first week of July), audio streaming became incorporated into the singles chart which means that a song gets the equivalent of one 'chart sale' if it is streamed 100 times. The OCC continues to compile a sales (only) chart and a streaming (only) chart. A total of 38 singles (the most since 2000) and 32 albums have claimed the top spot in 2014.

Number one artists
In the singles chart, Pharrell Williams, Clean Bandit, Sam Smith, Route 94, DVBBS, Borgeous, 5 Seconds of Summer, Aloe Blacc, Sigma, Kiesza, Mr Probz, Secondcity, Ed Sheeran, Ella Henderson, Oliver Heldens, Ariana Grande, Rixton, Magic!, Nico & Vinz, Lilly Wood, Nicki Minaj, Meghan Trainor, Gareth Malone's All Star Choir, Band Aid 30, Mark Ronson and Ben Haenow have all claimed their first number 1 single as a lead artist. Williams (with "Get Lucky" and "Blurred Lines"), Smith (with "La La La"), and Blacc (not credited; with "Wake Me Up") had all reached number one as featured artists prior to 2014.

In the albums chart, Robbie Williams and Bastille returned to the top of the charts, having reached number 1 in 2013 with Swings Both Ways and Bad Blood. You Me at Six, Bombay Bicycle Club, Katy B, Pharrell Williams, Elbow, Sam Bailey, Sam Smith, Collabro, Royal Blood, alt-J, George Ezra, Ella Henderson and Ben Howard have all claimed their first number 1 album.

"Rather Be" by Clean Bandit featuring Jess Glynne, "Happy" by Pharrell Williams and "All About That Bass" by Meghan Trainor have all spent the most weeks at number 1 in the singles chart with four and x by Ed Sheeran has spent the most weeks at number 1 in the albums chart with eleven.

Notable events and records
"Happy" by Pharrell Williams became the first song released in the 2010s to be certified triple platinum based on sales of more than 1.55 million and 25 million streams by July. With "Happy", Williams is the only act apart from The Beatles to achieve three million-selling singles in a 12-month period. "Happy" also became only the third single in chart history, and the first for over 50 years, to return to number 1 more than once. 

Cheryl broke the record for the most number one singles for a British female solo artist on 2 November with the release of "I Don't Care". The single sold over 82,000 copies in its first week and gave Cheryl her fifth UK number one. The record was previously jointly held by Rita Ora and Geri Halliwell.

"All About That Bass" by Meghan Trainor became the first single ever to reach the top 40 on streams alone.

"Thinking Out Loud" by Ed Sheeran broke a record for the longest climb to number 1 within the top 40, having taken 19 weeks to reach the summit. On its return to number 1 on 13 December, it became the first song ever to peak at number 1 due to streaming, having sold less than the number 2.

The top 10 best-selling albums of the year were all by British artists.

Number ones

Number-one singles
The 'sales' figures since the chart week ending 12 July include a proportion for audio streams and cannot be compared to previous weeks. See separate 'Singles sales chart' below.

Number-one albums

Number-one compilation albums

Year end charts

Biggest singles
This chart published by the Official Charts Company on 31 December 2014 is based on sales and streams for the whole of 2014.

Note: figures without a reference must always be deduced from the two others according to these operations: Sales + (Streams/100) = Chart sales / (Chart sales - Sales)*100 = Streams / Chart sales - (Streams/100) = Sales

Biggest-selling albums

Notes:

Biggest-selling compilation albums

Notes:

See also
 2014 in British music
 List of 2014 albums
 List of UK top 10 singles in 2014

Footnotes

References

Charts
United Kingdom
British record charts